The 1965–66 Serie A season was won by Internazionale.

Teams
Brescia, Napoli and SPAL had been promoted from Serie B.

Final classification

Results

Top goalscorers

References
Almanacco Illustrato del Calcio - La Storia 1898-2004, Panini Edizioni, Modena, September 2005

External links
  - All results on RSSSF Website.

Serie A seasons
Italy
1965–66 in Italian football leagues